2005 Chechen legislative election took part on November 27 of that year. This was the first parliamentary election in the Chechen Republic since the constitutional referendum that took place in 2003 and resulted in the adoption of the Constitution of the Chechen Republic.

Background
In August 2005 Russian President Vladimir Putin signed a presidential decree "On the election to Parliament of the Chechen Republic of the first convocation" announcing the election were to be held on November 27.

References

2005
2005 elections in Russia
2005 in Chechnya